Spirito Santo is a modern Roman Catholic church building in Urbania, in the Province of Pesaro and Urbino in Marche region, Italy.

History
Opposite the cathedral, the temple was erected to remember the victims of the disastrous air bombardment suffered by Urbania on 23 January 1944. It was built at the site of an earlier church. The façade is by the architect Del Mastro.

References

 

Roman Catholic churches in Urbania
20th-century Roman Catholic church buildings in Italy